is a former Japanese football player.

Playing career
Keitaro Koga played for FC Ryukyu in the 2014 season.

References

External links

1991 births
Living people
Chuo University alumni
Association football people from Kanagawa Prefecture
Japanese footballers
J3 League players
FC Ryukyu players
Association football defenders